Senator Coffee may refer to:

Glenn Coffee (born 1967), Oklahoma State Senate
John T. Coffee (1816–1890), Missouri State Senate
Richard J. Coffee (1925–2017), New Jersey State Senate
Max E. Coffey (born 1939), Illinois State Senate
Michael J. Coffey (1840s–1907), New York State Senate